The shortjaw cisco (Coregonus zenithicus) is a North-American  freshwater whitefish in the salmon family. One of the members of the broader Coregonus artedi complex of ciscoes, it is distributed widely in the deeper lakes of Canada, but populations in the Great Lakes have been declining and it is no longer present in Lakes Michigan, Huron, and Erie. It feeds mainly on crustaceans and insect larvae and spawns in the autumn on the lake bed. It is part of the important cisco (chub) fishery in the Great Lakes. The International Union for Conservation of Nature has rated its conservation status as "vulnerable". Shortjaw cisco have however evolved from the cisco Coregonus artedi independently in different lakes and different parts of the range, and conservation assessments therefore should be made on a lake-wise rather than range-wide basis.

Description
The shortjaw cisco has large, smooth scales and is iridescent silver, with a greenish back and white belly. The mouth is small and toothless, and the lower jaw is shorter than or equal in length to the upper jaw. Very difficult to differentiate from other cisco species by superficial appearance, this species typically has fewer gillrakers than other ciscoes.

Distribution
Once common throughout the upper Laurentian Great Lakes it is no longer found in Lake Michigan and populations are much lower in Lake Huron than in the past. The population in Lake Superior is known to be lower than historically, based on commercial catch statistics. Its status in Lake Nipigon is uncertain. It has been reported in at least 22 other lakes outside of the Great Lakes, from the Canadian provinces of Ontario, Manitoba, Saskatchewan, Alberta, and the Northwest Territories. It is not known whether the remaining Great Lakes populations are increasing, decreasing or stable. Population trends in other lakes are unknown.

Habitat
The shortjaw cisco is most commonly found in the deeper waters of large lakes.

Reproduction
Spawning occurs in the autumn. Eggs are deposited over the lake bottom in deep water and develop over three to four months, depending on water temperature. This fish reaches sexual maturity at five years of age.

Ecology
Crustaceans and insect larvae are important food items. Lake trout (Salvelinus namaycush) and burbot (Lota lota) are known to feed on shortjaw cisco. Shortjaw cisco are believed to be vulnerable to the invasive sea lamprey (Petromyzon marinus,) which has presumably played a role in its decline in the Great Lakes, where expansion in the range of sea lamprey has overlapped the decline in shortjaw cisco numbers.

Fisheries
This species was an important component of the cisco (chub) fishery in the Great Lakes. Competition and predation from rainbow smelt (Osmerus mordax) and alewife (Alosa pseudoharengus), two introduced exotic fish species, have had a negative impact on shortjaw cisco populations. The cumulative effect of these factors, sea lamprey predation and habitat changes associated with urban, agricultural, and industrial activities in the Great Lakes Basin undoubtedly combined to make this species vulnerable to over-exploitation, even at exploitation rates that had once been sustainable.

In lake Superior, the shortjaw cisco has been part of deepwater cisco fisheries. The deepwater ciscoes there also comprise Coregonus hoyi and Coregonus kiyi.

Systematics
The systematics of the group of fishes called "ciscoes" is complicated. The shortjaw cisco is part of the Coregonus artedi complex (which also comprises C. hoyi and C. kiyi). Particularly it was thought to be conspecific with the (presumably now extinct) longjaw cisco (Coregonus alpenae). Genetic data show that the shortjaw cisco is not a unique and coherent taxon, but has evolved from the sympatric Coregonus artedi s.str. independently in different lakes. Particularly there is a major distinction between the eastern and western parts of the range, and the differences between sympatric C. artedi and C. zenithicus are smaller than differences among lakes.

References

 
 
The Shortjaw Cisco... a Species at Risk Fisheries and Oceans Canada
Hoff MH, Todd TN (2004) Status of the shortjaw cisco (Coregonus zenithicus) in Lake Superior Annales Zoologici Fennici 41:147-154. 

Coregonus
Fish of the Great Lakes
Freshwater fish of the United States
Fish of Canada
Fish described in 1909
Taxa named by David Starr Jordan